Present is the ninth studio album by British progressive rock band Van der Graaf Generator, released in 2005.  It was the band's first studio album since The Quiet Zone/The Pleasure Dome in 1977, and the first with the 'classic' line-up since World Record in 1976. The Charisma Records label was re-activated for its release, as well as a re-issue series of Van der Graaf Generator's catalogue and Peter Hammill's solo releases from 1972-86.

For many years the band's lead singer and principal songwriter Peter Hammill had rejected the idea of a VdGG re-union, but in 2004 (following two unannounced re-unions at Hammill concerts), work began on an official re-union album.  Present was the result.  It consists of one disc of compositions (five songs plus an instrumental, "Boleas Panic"), and one disc of studio improvisations.  The band had always improvised in the studio throughout their history, but never before (except for the bootleg-quality Time Vaults), had any of these improvisations been officially released.

In 2005, the band embarked on a successful re-union tour.  Only two songs from Present were played on the tour: "Every Bloody Emperor" and "Nutter Alert".

Track listing

Disc 1 

"Every Bloody Emperor" (Hammill) - 7:03
"Boleas Panic" (Jackson) - 6:50
"Nutter Alert" (Hammill) - 6:11
"Abandon Ship!" (Evans, Hammill) - 5:07
"In Babelsberg" (Hammill) - 5:30
"On the Beach" (Jackson, Hammill) - 6:48

Disc 2 
All written by Banton, Evans, Jackson, Hammill

"Vulcan Meld" - 7:19
"Double Bass" - 6:34
"Slo Moves" - 6:24
"Architectural Hair" - 8:55
"Spanner" - 5:03
"Crux" - 5:50
"Manuelle" - 7:51
"'Eavy Mate" - 3:51
"Homage to Teo" - 4:45
"The Price of Admission" - 8:49

Personnel 
Van der Graaf Generator
 Peter Hammill – vocals, guitar, keyboards
 David Jackson – saxophone, flute
 Hugh Banton – organ, bass
 Guy Evans – drums, percussion

Reception 
The album was named as one of  Classic Rock‘s 10 essential progressive rock albums of the decade.

References

External links 
 Van Der Graaf Generator - Present (2005) album review by Dave Thompson, credits & releases at AllMusic.com
 Van Der Graaf Generator - Present (2005) album releases & credits at Discogs.com
 Van Der Graaf Generator - Present (2005) album to be listened as stream at Spotify.com

Van der Graaf Generator albums
2005 albums
Charisma Records albums